Providence is a Michelin Guide-starred restaurant in Hollywood, California.

See also 

 List of Michelin starred restaurants in Los Angeles and Southern California

References

External links

Michelin Guide starred restaurants in California
Restaurants in Los Angeles
Seafood restaurants in California